A fish fillet, from the French word  meaning a thread or strip, is the flesh of a fish which has been cut or sliced away from the bone by cutting lengthwise along one side of the fish parallel to the backbone. In preparation for filleting, any scales on the fish should be removed. The contents of the stomach also need careful detaching from the fillet. Because fish fillets do not contain the larger bones running along the vertebrae, they are often said to be "boneless". However, some species, such as the common carp, have smaller intramuscular bones called pins within the fillet. The skin present on one side may or may not be stripped from the fillet. Butterfly fillets can be produced by cutting the fillets on each side in such a way that they are held together by the flesh and skin of the belly.

Fish fillets can be contrasted with fish steaks (also known as fish cutlets), which are cut perpendicular to the spine and include the larger bones.


Filleting

Fish fillets comprise the flesh of the fish, which is the skeletal muscles and fat as opposed to the bones and organs. Fillets are usually obtained by slicing the fish parallel to the spine, rather than perpendicular to the spine as is the case with steaks. The remaining bones with the attached flesh is called the "frame", and is often used to make fish stock. As opposed to whole fish or fish steaks, fillets do not contain the fish's backbone; they yield less flesh, but are easier to eat.

Special cut fillets are taken from solid large blocks; these include a "natural" cut fillet, wedge, rhombus or tail shape. Fillets may be skinless or have skin on; pinbones may or may not be removed. A fletch is a large boneless fillet of halibut, swordfish or tuna.

There are several ways to cut a fish fillet:

 Cutlet: obtained by slicing from behind the head of the fish, round the belly and tapering towards the tail. The fish is then turned and the process repeated on the other side to produce a double fillet
 Single: more complex than the cutlet, produces two separate fillets, one from each side of the fish.
 "J" Cut: produced in the same way as a single fillet but the pin bones are removed by cutting a "J" shape from the fillet

Marketing

Eating

See also 
 Boneless Fish
 Fish fillet processor

Notes

References 
 Green, Aliza (2010) The Fishmonger's Apprentice: The Expert's Guide to Selecting, Preparing, and Cooking a World of Seafood, Taught by the Masters Quarry Books. .
 Murray J and Burt JR (1983) The Composition of Fish Torry Advisory Note 38, FAO,

External links 
 Descaling  YouTube
 Filletting YouTube
 Removing the stomach YouTube
 Removing small bones from the fillet YouTube
 Free Filleting Tutorials Fillet Fish Australia

Cuts of meat
Fish processing